Pseudosiccia is a monotypic moth genus of the family Noctuidae. Its only species, Pseudosiccia lichenaria, is found in western Java. Both the genus and species were first described by Roepke in 1956.

References

Acontiinae
Monotypic moth genera